Dubrovnik Annals is an annual peer-reviewed academic journal established in 1997. It covers all aspects of the history and culture of Dubrovnik and the Dubrovnik Republic. It is published by the Croatian Academy of Sciences and Arts's Institute for Historical Sciences and the editor-in-chief is Vladimir Stipetić. The annals are yearly presented at a conference in a festive atmosphere.

Abstracting and indexing
The journal is abstracted and indexed in Historical Abstracts.

References

External links

European history journals
Open access journals
Annual journals
Publications established in 1997
English-language journals
History of Dubrovnik
Academic journals of Croatia
Works about Croatia